Lower Modi-1 Hydroelectric Power Plant (Nepali: तल्लो मोदी १ जलविद्युत आयोजना, Tallo Modi-1 Jalbidyut Ayojana) is a run-of-river hydro-electric plant located in Parbat district of Nepal. The flow from Modi River is used to generate 10 MW electricity. The design flow is 26 m3/s, gross head is 50 m  and annual energy generation capacity is 61.01 GWh.

The plant was constructed by United Modi Hydropower Pvt. Ltd., an IPP of Nepal.

See also
Modi Khola Hydroelectric Power Plant, operated by Nepal Electricity Authority
List of power stations in Nepal

External links

References

Hydroelectric power stations in Nepal
Gravity dams
Run-of-the-river power stations
Dams in Nepal
Buildings and structures in Parbat District